Sidi Ameur is the name of:

 Sidi Ameur, El Bayadh, a town in El Bayadh Province, Algeria.
 Sidi Ameur, M'Sila, a town in M'Sila Province, Algeria.
 Sidi Ameur, Tunisia, a town in Tunisia.
 Sidi Ameur Al Hadi, a town in Morocco.